This is a list of awards received by American pop group NSYNC. The group has won three American Music Awards, five Billboard Music Awards, seven MTV Video Music Awards and has received eight Grammy Award nominations. Additionally, they have received two RIAA Diamond certifications. NSYNC received a star on the Hollywood Walk of Fame in April 2018.

American Music Awards
The American Music Awards is an annual American music awards show, created by Dick Clark in 1973.

|-
| style="text-align:center;"| 1999
| rowspan=3| NSYNC
| Favorite Pop/Rock New Artist
| 
|-
| style="text-align:center;"| 2000
| Favorite Pop/Rock Band, Duo or Group
| 
|-
| style="text-align:center;" rowspan=3| 2001
| 'Internet Fans' Artist of the Year
| 
|-
| No Strings Attached
| Favorite Pop/Rock Album
| 
|-
| rowspan=2| NSYNC
| Favorite Pop/Rock Band, Duo or Group
| 
|-
| style="text-align:center;" rowspan=2| 2002
| Favorite Pop/Rock Band, Duo or Group
| 
|-
| Celebrity
| Favorite Pop/Rock Album
| 
|-

Billboard Music Awards
The Billboard Music Awards is an honor given by Billboard, a publication and music popularity chart covering the music business.

|-
| style="text-align:center;" rowspan=4| 2000
|rowspan=2| No Strings Attached
| Album of the Year
| 
|-
| Special Award for biggest one-week sales ever of an album
| 
|-
| rowspan=2| NSYNC
| Top 40 Artist of the Year
| 
|-
| Albums Artist Duo/Group of the Year
| 
|-
| style="text-align:center;" rowspan=3| 2001
| rowspan=2| NSYNC
| Albums Artist of the Year
| 
|-
| Albums Artist Duo/Group of the Year
| 
|-
| Celebrity
| Special Award for biggest one-week sales for an album in 2001
| 
|-

Blockbuster Entertainment Awards
The Blockbuster Entertainment Awards was a film awards ceremony, founded by Blockbuster Inc., that ran from 1995 until 2001.

|-
| style="text-align:center;"| 1999
| NSYNC
| Favorite New Artist
| 
|-
| style="text-align:center;"| 2000
| "Music of my Heart"
| Favorite Song from a Movie
| 
|-
| style="text-align:center;" rowspan=4| 2001
| No Strings Attached
| Favorite CD
| 
|-
| "Bye, Bye, Bye"
| Favorite Single
| 
|-
| rowspan=2| NSYNC
| Favorite Group of the Year
| 
|-
| Favorite Pop Group
| 
|-

Grammy Awards
The Grammy Awards are awarded annually by the National Academy of Recording Arts and Sciences. NSYNC has received 8 nominations, including Record of the Year.

|-
| style="text-align:center;" rowspan="2"| 2000 || "Music of My Heart" || Best Pop Collaboration with Vocals || 
|-
| "God Must Have Spent a Little More Time on You" || Best Country Collaboration with Vocals || 
|-
| style="text-align:center;" rowspan="3"| 2001 ||style="text-align:left;" rowspan="2"|"Bye Bye Bye" || Record of the Year || 
|-
| Best Pop Performance by a Duo or Group with Vocals || 
|-
| No Strings Attached || Best Pop Vocal Album || 
|-
| style="text-align:center;" rowspan="2"| 2002 || "Gone" || Best Pop Performance by a Duo or Group with Vocals || 
|-
| Celebrity || Best Pop Vocal Album || 
|-
| style="text-align:center;" rowspan="1"| 2003 || "Girlfriend" || Best Pop Performance by a Duo or Group with Vocals || 
|-

Guinness World Records
The Guinness World Records is a reference book published annually, listing world records.

|-
|2000
|No Strings Attached
|Fastest-selling pop album in U.S. history
|
|-

Hollywood Walk of Fame
The Hollywood Walk of Fame comprises more than 2,600 stars embedded in the sidewalks of Hollywood Boulevard, representing permanent public monuments to achievement in the entertainment industry.

|-
|2018
|NSYNC
|Recording Artists
|
|-

Juno Awards
The Juno Awards are presented annually to Canadian musical artists and bands to acknowledge their artistic and technical achievements in all aspects of music.

|-
| style="text-align:center;"| 2001
| No Strings Attached
| Best Selling Album (Foreign or Domestic)
| 
|-

Mnet Asian Music Awards
The Mnet Asian Music Awards is a South Korean music awards ceremony presented annually by entertainment company CJ E&M.
Mnet Asian Music Awards

|-
| style="text-align:center;"| 2001
| "Pop"
| Best International Artist
| 
|-

MTV Europe Music Awards
An MTV Europe Music Award is an award presented by Viacom International Media Networks to honour artists and music in pop culture.

|-
| style="text-align:center;"|2000
| rowspan=2| NSYNC
| rowspan=2| Best Pop
| 
|-
| style="text-align:center;"|2001
| 
|-

MTV Video Music Awards
An MTV Video Music Award is an award presented by the cable channel MTV to honor the best in the music video medium.

|-
| style="text-align:center;" rowspan=4| 1999
|rowspan=4|"Tearin’ Up My Heart"
|-
| Best Group Video
| 
|-
| Best Pop Video
| 
|-
| Viewer's Choice
| 
|-
|rowspan=6| 2000
|rowspan=6|"Bye Bye Bye"
| Video of the Year
| 
|-
| Best Group Video
| 
|-
| Best Pop Video
| 
|-
| Best Dance Video
| 
|-
| Best Choreography in a Video
| 
|-
| Viewer's Choice
| 
|-
|rowspan=6| 2001
|rowspan=6| "Pop"
| Best Group Video
| 
|-
| Best Dance Video
| 
|-
| Best Pop Video
| 
|-
| Viewer's Choice
| 
|-
| Breakthrough Video
| 
|-
| Best Editing in a Video
| 
|-
|rowspan=6| 2002
| "Gone"
| Video of the Year
| 
|-
|rowspan=2| "Girlfriend"
| Best Group Video
| 
|-
| Best Pop Video
| 
|-

MuchMusic Video Awards
The MuchMusic Video Awards are annual awards presented by the Canadian television channel Much to honour the year's best music videos.

|-
| style="text-align:center;"| 2000
| "Bye Bye Bye"
| Peoples Choice: Favorite International Group
| 
|-

Nickelodeon Kids' Choice Awards
The Nickelodeon Kids' Choice Awards is an American children's awards ceremony show that is produced by Nickelodeon.

|-
| style="text-align:center;"| 1999
| NSYNC
| Favorite Music Group
| 
|-

People's Choice Awards
The People's Choice Awards is an American awards show, recognizing the people and the work of popular culture, voted on by the general public.

|-
| style="text-align:center;"| 2001
| rowspan=2| NSYNC
| Favorite Musical Group or Band
| 
|-
| style="text-align:center;"| 2002
| Favorite Musical Group or Band
| 
|-

Teen Choice Awards
The Teen Choice Awards is an annual awards show that airs on the Fox television network.

|-
| style="text-align:center;" rowspan=5|2000
| rowspan=2| "It's Gonna Be Me"
| Choice Music: Summer Song
| 
|-
| Choice Music: Video
| 
|-
| "Bye Bye Bye"
| Choice Music: Single
| 
|-
| NSYNC
| Choice Music: Pop Group
| 
|-
| No Strings Attached
| Choice Music: Album
| 
|-
| style="text-align:center;" rowspan=4|2001
| "Pop"
| Choice Music: Single
| 
|-
| Celebrity
| Choice Music: Album 
| 
|-
| NSYNC
| Choice Music: Pop Group
| 
|-
| "This I Promise You"
| Choice Music: Love Song
| 
|-
| style="text-align:center;" rowspan=4|2002
| rowspan=2| "Girlfriend"
| Choice Music: Single
| 
|-
| Choice Music: Hook Up
| 
|-
| "Girlfriend"
| Choice Music: R&B/Hip-Hop Track
| 
|-
| "Gone"
| Choice Music: Love Song
| 
|-

References

Awards
Lists of awards received by American musician
Lists of awards received by musical group